Naumburg (Saale) Hauptbahnhof is located in the German state of Saxony-Anhalt and is classified by Deutsche Bahn as a category 3 station. The station is part of the zone of the Mitteldeutscher Verkehrsverbund (Central German Transport Association) and is the main station of the Burgenlandkreis (district).

History

The station was opened in 1846, when the Thuringian Railway went into operation. The Unstrut Railway was opened on 1 October 1889. This line once connected to the Sangerhausen–Erfurt railway. Finally, the Naumburg–Teuchern railway opened on 28 June 1900. This connects to the Weißenfels–Zeitz railway.

Services
The Intercity-Express services are partly formed from coupled ICE T sets. The Intercity (IC) services are operated with locomotives of classes 101 and 120, hauling IC coaches. Regional services are operated with locomotives of class 182, hauling y-Wagen (“y-coaches”, also known as "Halberstadt" coaches).

Notes

External links 

Railway stations in Saxony-Anhalt
Railway stations in Germany opened in 1846
1846 establishments in Prussia
Buildings and structures in Burgenlandkreis